Princess Anna Vasa Tour is a Stage race cycling race, held annually in Poland. It is rated 2.2.

Winners

References

Cycle races in Poland
Annual sporting events in Poland
Recurring sporting events established in 2022
UCI Europe Tour races
Women's road bicycle races